New Horizons Computer Learning Centers is the world's largest independent IT  training company with over 300 locations in 72 countries. New Horizons Computer Learning Centers Inc is a subsidiary of New Horizons Worldwide Inc.  New Horizons operates as a franchise model to support the worldwide expansion of their training centers.

New Horizons provides instruction in the use of personal computers, computer software and business skills.  It offers vendor-authorized training and certifications for Microsoft, Cisco, CompTIA and VMware. Training methods include instructor-led courses, both in person and online, as well as self-directed labs. In many cases, students are provided with courseware developed by preferred courseware vendor, Logical Operations.

Some students attend with the support of their employers as part of corporate training programs. Some are  individual students.

Company history

New Horizons was founded by Michael Brinda in Laguna Hills in 1982. In 1985, after adding Lotus and C++ to its curriculum, the company moved to larger offices in Irvine. The addition of classes in Windows programming in 1988 necessitated another expansion to offices in Santa Ana. By 1992, further additions to its course offerings enabled the company to expand nationwide. The first international location opened in Mexico City in 1993.

The following year, New Horizons was purchased by Handex Consulting & Remediation LLC, which resulted in further international expansion into South America, Asia, Africa and the Middle East. At this point, New Horizons had become the largest network of Microsoft Authorized Technical Education Centers (ATECs). The company's first European location (in Barcelona) was opened shortly thereafter.

Within a year, New Horizons became the largest independent IT training company in the world with over 154 training centers and 100 Microsoft Certified Technical Education Centers (CTECs).

New Horizons and the EC-Council became partners in 2004 to deliver Certified Ethical Hacker and Countermeasures Training.

In 2011, New Horizons was granted VMware Authorized Training Center Status, allowing North American centers to deliver VMware training.

In 2019, New Horizons (Spokane) was fined $120,000 by the US Department of Justice to resolve false claims related to the GI Bill.

Awards and recognition

 2000: Fortune names New Horizons one of America's "100 Fastest Growing Companies", and Forbes rates New Horizons one of the "200 Best Small Companies"
 2001: Bloomberg BusinessWeek names New Horizons to its list of "100 Hot Growth Companies"
 2003: New Horizons wins a Gold Excellence in eLearning Award from the BrandonHall Group
 2006: New Horizons is honored as Partner of the Year for Technology Innovation at the 2006 Microsoft Worldwide Partner Program Awards
 2009: New Horizons wins US & Canada Learning Partner of the Year at the Cisco Partner Summit 
 2011: TrainingIndustry.com names New Horizons one of its Top 20 IT Training Companies
 2012: New Horizons selected as at Microsoft Learning Competency Marketing Excellence Partner of the Year Award Finalist
 2015: New Horizons Computer Learning Centers Receives Global Training (VATC) Partner of the Year Award at VMware Partner Exchange 2015

References 

New Horizons Computer Learning Center Panamá, abrió sus puertas en 1998

External links 

 
 
 Training Connection

Information technology institutes
Educational institutions established in 1982
1982 establishments in California